Baiyundadaobei station, formerly Yongtai station during planning, is a metro station on Line 3 of the Guangzhou Metro. The underground station is located at the intersection of Guangcong Highway and Jianpeng Road in the Baiyun District. It started operation on 30October 2010.

References

External links

Railway stations in China opened in 2010
Guangzhou Metro stations in Baiyun District